= Jathara (2024 film) =

Indian thriller action film

- Directed by: Sathish Babu Ratakonda
- Written by: Sathish Babu Ratakonda, Naresh Paruchuri, Navachethan Reddy
- Produced by: Radhakrishna Reddy, Siva Shankar Reddy
- Starring: Sathish Babu Ratakonda, Deeya Raj, RK Pinapala, Mahaboob Pasha Shaik, Battula Lakshmi, Galla Manjunath, Srinivasa Reddy
- Cinematography: KV Prasad
- Edited by: Mahendranath
- Music by: Sreejith Edavana
- Production companies: Radhakrishnaa Production Company, Movieteck LLC
- Release date: 8 November 2024
- Country: India
- Language: Telugu

Jathara is a 2024 Indian Telugu-language thriller, action film directed by Sathish Babu Ratakonda and produced under Radhakrishnaa Production Company.

The film starred Sathish Babu Ratakonda, RK Pinapala, Deeya Raj, Gopal Reddy, Galla Manjunath, Mahaboob Pasha Shaik, Srinivasa Reddy, and Battula Lakshmi are in main casts.

The cinematography of the film is done by KV Prasad, music is composed by Sreejith Edavana, the action sequences are choreographed by Rajesh Lakna.

The film was released on 8 November 2024.

== Premise ==
In the enchanting terrains, the goddess Gangamma bestowed her blessings upon settlements. The Jathara intertwines folklore, treachery, vengeance, and divine intervention, deepening in the 19th century as it examines human deeds and celestial influences that shape destinies.

== Production ==
The film was officially started in February 2023 and the Principal photography commenced in September 2023. It was shot sporadically in several legs over 5 months due to heavy rains and wrapped by late-Feb 2024. The entire film was set and filmed in Nellimanda in Chittoor District, Andhra Pradesh.

== Cast ==
- Sathish Babu Ratakonda in a dual role as
  - Paleti, Chalapathi's father
  - Chalapathi, Paleti's son
- R.K Pinnapala as Gangireddy
- Deeya Raj as Venkatalacchimi
- Gopal Reddy as Bramhanna
- Srinivasa Reddy
- Galla Manjunath as Changalrayudu
- Madhiuvantha Boyapati as Redoramma
- Ramu Galla as Venkataramudu
- Banu Prakash as Dora
- Mahaboob Basha as Talari
- Sai Vikranth as Kona
- Chinnareddy as Bujji
- Srinivasulu Reddy as Chinabba
- Vijayalakshmi as Munemma
- Rajarathnam as Raghavaiah
